The 2017 ANZ Premiership season was the inaugural season of Netball New Zealand's ANZ Premiership. All matches were broadcast on Sky Sport (New Zealand). With a team coached by Reinga Bloxham, captained by Wendy Frew and featuring Gina Crampton, Jhaniele Fowler-Reid, Shannon Francois, and Jane Watson, Southern Steel finished the 2017 season as inaugural ANZ Premiership winners. After finishing the regular season unbeaten and as minor premiers, Steel defeated Central Pulse 69–53 in the grand final. This saw Steel complete a 16 match unbeaten season. The top three teams from the season – Steel, Pulse and Northern Mystics qualified for the 2017 Netball New Zealand Super Club.

Transfers

Head coaches and captains

Notes
 Marianne Delaney-Hoshek replaced Sue Hawkins as Mainland Tactix coach on 24 April.

Pre-season tournament
In March 2017, Central Pulse and Netball Central hosted the official ANZ Premiership pre-season tournament at Te Wānanga o Raukawa in Ōtaki. All six teams participated in the three day tournament.

Day 1

Day 2

Day 3

Notes
 40 minute game, 4 x 10 minute quarters.

Regular season

Round 1
The regular season began with a Super Sunday event hosted at Claudelands Arena. There were wins for the host team, Waikato Bay of Plenty Magic and for Central Pulse and Southern Steel.

Round 2

Round 3

Round 4

Round 5

Round 6
Round 6 featured a second Super Sunday event, hosted by Southern Steel at Stadium Southland. Steel remained unbeaten, while Waikato Bay of Plenty Magic and Northern Stars both claimed close wins.

Round 7

Round 8

Round 9

Round 10

Round 11

Round 12
The third Super Sunday event was hosted by Northern Mystics at The Trusts Arena. Southern Steel remain unbeaten. Mystics and Central Pulse were the other winners on the day.

Round 13

Final ladder

Finals Series

Elimination final

Grand final

Award winners

Season statistics

References

 
2017
2017 in New Zealand netball